The Brazeau River is a river in western Alberta, Canada. It is a major tributary of the North Saskatchewan River.

The river was named for Joseph Brazeau, a linguist associated with the Palliser Expedition.

Course

The river originates in the heights of the Canadian Rockies from Brazeau Lake (which is fed by creeks that flow from Coronet Glacier and the Queen Elizabeth Ranges) and flows east through the Rocky Mountains foothills until it merges into the North Saskatchewan River between Drayton Valley and Rocky Mountain House at Brazeau Forks.

The upper course runs eastwards from Jasper National Park into Brazeau Canyon Wildland Provincial Park. The O'Chiese First Nation is established at the confluence with Nordegg River.

The river, and various other local geographic features, were named after Joseph Brazeau, a Missouri-born fur trader working for the Hudson's Bay Company in the area between 1852 and 1864.

Hydroelectric development

The Brazeau River has long been seen as a potential site for hydroelectric power generation. The earliest scheme to harness the power of the river was hatched in 1913 and involved a dam and storage on Brazeau Lake. The plan was scuttled after the discovery of a large underflow at Brazeau Lake, precluding its use as a storage facility.

The  Brazeau Reservoir was created on the lower course through the construction of the Brazeau Dam.  Its hydroelectric power plant is Alberta's largest, with a capacity of 355 megawatts and an annual production of about 394,000 megawatt hours of electrical energy.

Tributaries

Boulder Creek
Four Point Creek
Brazeau Lake
John-John Creek
Upper Longview Lake
Job Creek
Whisker Creek, Whisker Lakes, Job Lake, Leah Lake, Samson Lake
Isaac Creek
Race Creek
 
Southesk River
Southesk Lake
Thistle Creek
Chimney Creek
Marshybank Creek
Marshybank Lake
Canyon Creek
Moosehound Creek
Cardinal River
Blackstone River
Elk River
Nordegg River

See also
Geography of Alberta
List of Alberta rivers

References

External links

Rivers of Alberta
North Saskatchewan River